Kalateh-ye Khan (also Romanized as Kalāteh-ye Khān and Kalāteh-i-Khān; also known as Kalāt-e Khān and Ākbarīyeh) is a village in Qaen Rural District, in the Central District of Qaen County, South Khorasan Province, Iran. At the 2006 census, its population was 322, in 90 families.

References 

Populated places in Qaen County